Djedneferre Dedumose II was a native ancient Egyptian pharaoh during the Second Intermediate Period. According to egyptologists Kim Ryholt and Darrell Baker, he was a ruler of the Theban 16th Dynasty.<ref name="KR">Ryholt, K. S. B. (1997). [https://books.google.com/books?id=ANRi7cM5ZwsC&q=dedumose The Political Situation in Egypt during the Second Intermediate Period, c. 1800 - 1550 BC]. Copenhagen: Museum Tusculanum Press. .</ref>  Alternatively, Jürgen von Beckerath, Thomas Schneider and Detlef Franke see him as a king of the 13th Dynasty.Jürgen von Beckerath: Chronologie des pharaonischen Ägyptens, Münchner Ägyptologische Studien 46, Mainz am Rhein, 1997Detlef Franke (1994). Das Heiligtum des Heqaib auf Elephantine. Geschichte eines Provinzheiligtums im Mittleren Reich, Studien zur Archäologie und Geschichte Altägyptens. vol. 9. Heidelberger Orientverlag, Heidelberg,  (Heidelberg, Universität, Habilitationsschrift, 1991), see p. 77-78

Dating issues
Williams and others place Dedumose as the last king of Egypt's 13th Dynasty. Precise dates for Dedumose are unknown, but according to the commonly accepted Egyptian chronology his reign probably ended around 1690 BC.

Attestations

Djedneferre Dedumose II is known from a stela originally from Gebelein which is now in the Cairo Museum (CG 20533). On the stela Dedumose claims to have been raised for kingship, which may indicate he is a son of Dedumose I, although the statement may also merely be a form of propaganda. The martial tone of the stela probably reflects the constant state of war of the final years of the 16th Dynasty, when the Hyksos invaded its territory: 

Ludwig Morenz believes that the above excerpt of the stele, in particular "who is acclaimed to the kingship", may confirm the controversial idea of Eduard Meyer that certain pharaohs were elected to office.

As Josephus' Timaios
Dedumose is usually linked to Timaios, p. 52 mentioned by the historian Josephus – who was quoting Manetho – as a king during whose reign an army of Asiatic foreigners subdued the country without a fight.
The introductory phrase in Josephus' quotation of Manetho του Τιμαιος ονομα appears somewhat ungrammatical and following A. von Gutschmid, the Greek words του Τιμαιος ([genitive definite article] Timaios [nominative]) is often combined into the proposed name Τουτιμαιος (Tutimaios) based on the tenuous argument of von Gutschmid that this sounded like Tutmes i.e. Thutmose. This has influenced the transliteration of the name Dedumose as Dudimose in order to reinforce the resemblance but this transliteration is not justified by the hieroglyphic spelling of the name. Nevertheless Dedumose did rule either as a Pharaoh of the 13th dynasty which preceded the Hyksos or as part of the 16th dynasty contemporaneous with the early Hyksos and the actual form Timaios in the manuscript of Josephus still plausibly represents his name. Whiston's translation of Josephus understands the phrase to mean “[There was a king] of ours (του), whose name was Timaios (Τιμαιος ονομα)." A. Bülow-Jacobsen has suggested however that the phrase in Josephus may have been derived via a series of (unattested) scribal errors from του πραγματος ("of the matter") and that ονομα ("this is a name", typically left out of translations) is a later gloss whence the original text of Josephus did not contain the name of a Pharaoh at all.Wolfgang Helck, Eberhard Otto, Wolfhart Westendorf (1986), "Stele - Zypresse": Volume 6 of Lexikon der Ägyptologie, Otto Harrassowitz Verlag. 

Fringe theories
There have been revisionistic attempts by the historian Immanuel Velikovsky and Egyptologist David Rohl to identify Dedumose II as the Pharaoh of the Exodus, much earlier than the mainstream candidates. Rohl, in particular, attempted to change views on Egyptian history by shortening the Third Intermediate Period of Egypt by almost 300 years. As a by-result the synchronisms with the biblical narrative have changed, making Dedumose the pharaoh of the Exodus. Rohl's theory, however, has failed to find support among most scholars in his field.

Between the 18th and 19th century, Francis Wilford claimed that Josephus' account is reportedly mentioned on an Indian text concerning an Egyptian tale, in which the Pharaoh's name appears as Tamovatsa''.

References

17th-century BC Pharaohs
16th-century BC Pharaohs
Pharaohs of the Sixteenth Dynasty of Egypt
Pharaohs of the Thirteenth Dynasty of Egypt